Forer is a surname. Notable persons with that name include:

 Bertram Forer (1914–2000), American psychologist, father of the Forer effect
 Jane F. Gentleman (born 1940), American-Canadian statistician
 Joseph Forer (1910–1986), American attorney who helped fight against segregation
 Laurenz Forer (1580–1659), Swiss Jesuit theologian
 Oded Forer (born 1977), Israeli politician